Federation of Freedom (FdL) was a centre-right parliamentary group in the Italian Senate.

The group was formed in May 2017 by five defectors from the Great Autonomies and Freedom (GAL) group, including four of Identity and Action (IdeA) and one of the Moderates (Mod); two splinters from Popular Alternative (AP); two senators from the Mixed Group, including the one of the Italian Liberal Party (PLI); and one senator of Forza Italia (FI), the main successor of The People of Freedom (PdL). Eight of ten FdL members had been elected with the PdL in the 2013 general election.

Since its formation, with the only exception of the Moderates (affiliated to the centre-left Democratic Party, PD), the FdL aimed at strengthening its members' ties both with GAL and FI, and being part of the centre-right coalition with Lega Nord (LN) and Brothers of Italy (FdI) in the 2018 general election. Additionally, the FdL was seen as the embryo of the centre-right's "fourth leg" in the election, other than the LN, FI and Brothers of Italy (FdI).

The group was dissolved at the end of the parliamentary term, after the 2018 general election. In the election group leader Gaetano Quagliariello (IdeA) was re-elected with FI, while Cinzia Bonfrisco (PLI) with the LN.

Composition

References

Defunct political party alliances in Italy
Parliamentary groups in Italy